Vorerzgebirgisch is a variety of Upper Saxon German. It is a transitional dialect between Meißnisch, Vogtländisch and Erzgebirgisch. An example of an urban variety of Vorerzgebirgisch is the Chemnitz dialect.

References

Bibliography

 

Central German languages
German dialects
Languages of Germany